Marjorie Harris (born 15 September 1937 as Marjorie Stibbards in Shaunavon, Saskatchewan) is a Canadian non-fiction writer who has published numerous books on gardening.  

In 1959, she graduated from McMaster University in Hamilton, Ontario with Honours Bachelor of Arts degree in English. Her first marriage was to television producer and musician Barry Harris. Currently, she lives in Toronto, Ontario, Canada with her second husband, writer Jack Batten.

Besides writing 15 books she was a radio host job at CBC Radio's Metro Morning as 'The Urban Gardener' and wrote articles and columns on gardening for magazines and newspapers. She was making her living as a free-lance writer, editor, producer, and radio commentator. The McMaster university library acquired Marjorie Harris's archives in July 2005 and March 2006. At the same location she was honoured 2007 with an exhibition titled 'Marjorie Harris's Garden of the World'.

In 2003, she appeared in the Recreating Eden TV series episode "A Perfect Life".

Works
Partial listing of books written or co-written by Marjorie Harris:

1984: with Kildare Dobbs, Historic Canada (Methuen) 
1984: Toronto The City of Neighbourhoods (McClelland and Stewart) 
1986: with David Suzuki and Hans Blohm, Sciencescape: The Nature of Canada (Oxford University Press) 
1995: In the Garden: Thoughts on the Changing Seasons (HarperCollins) 
1996: The Healing Garden (HarperCollins) 
1999: Seasons of My Garden (HarperCollins) ,

References

External links
Marjorie Harris official website, accessed 18 July 2006
McMaster University: Marjorie Harris fonds, accessed 18 July 2006
Videos and Photos of Marjorie Harris 2010, accessed 11 March 2015

1937 births
Living people
Canadian garden writers
McMaster University alumni
People from Shaunavon, Saskatchewan
Writers from Saskatchewan
Writers from Toronto